My Brother Talks to Horses is a 1947 American comedy film directed by Fred Zinnemann, starring Jackie "Butch" Jenkins, Peter Lawford, and Beverly Tyler.

Plot
Living with his family in Baltimore, 9-year-old Lewie Penrose (Butch Jenkins) claims that he can converse with horses, and also pick the winners of upcoming races. When it appears as though Lewie is telling the truth, he attracts the interest of gambler Rich Roeder (Charles Ruggles), who needs a "sure thing" in the upcoming Preakness Stakes. Meanwhile, Lewie's older brother John (Peter Lawford) carries on a romance with the lovely Martha (Beverly Tyler).

Cast

 Jackie "Butch" Jenkins as Lewie Penrose  
 Peter Lawford as John S. Penrose  
 Beverly Tyler as Martha Sterling  
 Edward Arnold as Mr. Bledsoe  
 Charles Ruggles as Richard Pennington Roeder  
 Spring Byington as Mrs. 'Ma' Penrose  
 O.Z. Whitehead as Mr. Puddy  

 Paul Langton as Mr. Gillespie  
 Ernest Whitman as Mr. Mordecai  
 Irving Bacon as Mr. Piper  
 Lillian Yarbo as Psyche  
 Howard Freeman as Hector Damson  
 Harry Hayden as Mr. Gibley

Reception
The film was not a success at the box office, earning $733,000 in the US and Canada and $243,000 elsewhere, resulting in a loss of $867,000.

References

External links 
 
 
 

1947 films
1947 comedy films
American black-and-white films
American comedy films
Films directed by Fred Zinnemann
Films set in 1909
Films set in Baltimore
American horse racing films
Metro-Goldwyn-Mayer films
1940s English-language films
1940s American films
English-language comedy films